Archimaga pyractis is a species of moth of the family Tortricidae. It is found in Sri Lanka.

References

Moths described in 1905
Chlidanotini
Moths of Asia